The King of Comedy is a 1982 American satirical crime film directed by Martin Scorsese and starring Robert De Niro (in his fifth collaboration with Scorsese), Jerry Lewis and Sandra Bernhard. Written by Paul D. Zimmerman, the film focuses on themes such as celebrity worship and American media culture. 20th Century Fox released the film on February 18, 1983, in the United States, though the film was released two months earlier in Iceland.

Production began in New York on June 1, 1981 to avoid clashing with a forthcoming writers' strike, and opened at the Cannes Film Festival in 1983. The film received mostly positive reviews from critics but was a flop at the box office, grossing only $2.5 million against its $19 million budget. It is the first production of Embassy International Pictures, later Regency Enterprises, and is also Jerry Lewis's final film for 20th Century Fox.

Plot 
Rupert Pupkin is a delusional and aspiring stand-up comedian trying to launch his career. After meeting Jerry Langford, a successful comedian and talk-show host, Rupert believes his "big break" has finally come. He attempts to book a spot on Langford's show, but is continually rebuffed by his staff, particularly Cathy Long, and finally by Langford himself. Along the way, Rupert indulges in elaborate and obsessive fantasies in which he and Langford are colleagues and friends.

Hoping to impress, Rupert invites a date, Rita, to accompany him when he arrives uninvited at Langford's country home. When Langford returns home to find Rupert and Rita settling in, he angrily tells them to leave. Rupert continues brushing off Jerry's dismissals and Rita's urging until Jerry finally retorts that he had only told Rupert he could call him so Jerry would get rid of him. Bitterly vowing to work "50 times harder", Rupert finally leaves.

Exhausted with rejection, Rupert hatches a kidnapping plot with the help of Masha, a fellow stalker similarly obsessed with Langford. As ransom, Rupert demands that he be given the opening spot on that evening's episode of Langford's show (guest hosted by Tony Randall) and that the show be broadcast in normal fashion. The network's bosses, lawyers and the FBI agree to his demands, with the understanding that Langford will be released once the show airs. Between the taping of the show and the broadcast, Masha has her "dream date" with Langford, who is taped to a chair in her parents' Manhattan townhouse. Langford convinces her to untie him under the guise of seduction, at which time he seizes the gun, only to find it is a toy gun loaded with faulty pellets. He slaps Masha to subdue her and flees downtown, where he angrily sees Rupert's full stand-up routine on a series of television display sets.

Meanwhile, Rupert's act is well received by the studio audience. In his act, he describes his troubled upbringing while simultaneously laughing at his circumstances. Rupert then closes his act by confessing to the audience that he kidnapped Langford to break into show business. As the audience still laughs (thinking it's still a part of his act), Rupert responds by saying: "Tomorrow, you'll know I wasn't kidding and you'll all think I'm crazy. But I figure it this way: better to be king for a night than a schmuck for a lifetime." Having shown the broadcast to Rita at her bar, he proudly submits to his arrest as the FBI agents profess distaste for his jokes.

The film ends with a news report of Rupert's crime, his six-year prison sentence and parole after two years, set to a montage of storefronts stocking his "long-awaited" autobiography, King for a Night, which states that Rupert still considers Langford his friend and mentor and that he is currently weighing several "attractive offers," including comedy tours and a film adaptation of his memoirs. Rupert later takes the stage for a television special with a live audience, where an announcer enthusiastically introduces him as the King of Comedy while Rupert himself prepares to address his audience. The announcer repeats "Ladies and gentlemen, Rupert Pupkin", or similar variations seven times while the audience claps continuously and Rupert smiles, waves and bows at them.

Cast

Principal cast 
 Robert De Niro as Rupert Pupkin, a struggling stand-up comedian with mental health issues who longs to appear on Langford's show. Pupkin styles himself as "The King of Comedy".
 Jerry Lewis as Jerry Langford, a famous late-night TV host.
 Sandra Bernhard as Masha, another mentally unstable fan of Langford.
 Diahnne Abbott as Rita Keene, a bartender who is Rupert's love interest.

Supporting cast 
 Shelley Hack as Cathy Long, Langford's main secretary.
 Margo Winkler as a receptionist of Langford's production company
 Kim Chan as Jonno, a house servant of Langford.
 Frederick De Cordova as Bert Thomas, a producer of Langford's show.
 Edgar Scherick as Wilson Crockett, a network television executive.
 Senator Bobby as Clarence McCabe, a man who believes he is the third guest on Pupkin's show
 Ed Herlihy as himself
 Tony Randall as himself
 Victor Borge as himself
 Joyce Brothers as herself

Cameo appearances 
 Catherine Scorsese as Mrs. Pupkin, Rupert's mother (voice only)
 Cathy Scorsese as Dolores, a fan of Pupkin in one of his daydreams.
 Martin Scorsese as TV director
 Charles Scorsese as first Man at Bar

The Clash – members Mick Jones, Joe Strummer, Paul Simonon, their manager Kosmo Vinyl and the musicians Ellen Foley and Don Letts appeared as Street Scum.
Mary Elizabeth Mastrantonio played an extra in a crowd scene and was not listed in the credits of the film.

Production
After Raging Bull was completed, Scorsese had thought about retiring from feature films to make documentaries instead because he felt "unsatisfied" and had not found his "inner peace" yet. However, he was keen to do a pet project of his, The Last Temptation of Christ, and wanted De Niro to play Jesus Christ. De Niro was not interested and preferred their next collaboration to be a comedy. He had purchased the rights of a script by film critic Paul D. Zimmerman. Michael Cimino was announced as the director for The King of Comedy on March 7, 1979, but was later replaced by Martin Scorsese on November 10, due to production being stalled by his focus on the editing process of Heaven's Gate.

Bob Fosse briefly considered directing the film and suggested Andy Kaufman as Rupert Pupkin, Sandra Bernhard as Masha and Sammy Davis Jr. as Jerry Langford. In the original draft that Fosse read, the Langford character was to be a self-absorbed, hypocritical host of 24-hour TV telethons for charity much like Jerry Lewis's own yearly telethons. Ultimately, Fosse passed on the film in favor of directing Star 80 instead and the Langford character was switched from a telethon host to a late-night talk show. Scorsese pondered whether he could face shooting another film, particularly with a looming strike by the Writers Guild of America. Producer Arnon Milchan knew he could do the project away from Hollywood interference by filming entirely on location in New York and deliver it on time with the involvement of a smaller film company.

After such a strong critical appreciation for the way in which Scorsese had shot Raging Bull, the director felt that The King of Comedy needed more of a raw cinematic style, one of which would take its cues from early silent cinema, using more static camera shots, and fewer dramatic close-ups. Scorsese has noted that Edwin S. Porter's 1903 film Life of an American Fireman had greatly influenced The King of Comedy's visual style.

De Niro prepared for Rupert Pupkin's role by developing a "role reversal" technique, consisting of chasing down his own autograph-hunters, stalking them and asking them many questions. As Scorsese remembered, he even agreed to meet and talk with one of his longtime stalkers:The guy was waiting for him with his wife, a shy suburban woman who was rather embarrassed by the situation. He wanted to take him to dinner at their house, a two-hour drive from New York. After he had persuaded him to stay in Manhattan, [De Niro] asked him, 'Why are you stalking me? What do you want?' He replied, 'To have dinner with you, have a drink, chat. My mom asked me to say hi.'De Niro also spent months watching stand-up comedians at work to get the rhythm and timing of their performances right. Fully in phase with his character, he went as far as declining an invitation to dinner from Lewis because he was "supposed to be at his throat and ready to kill him for [his] chance".

In the biography/overview of his work, Scorsese on Scorsese, the director had high praise for Jerry Lewis, stating that during their first conversation before shooting, Lewis was extremely professional and assured him before shooting that there would be no ego clashes or difficulties. Scorsese said he felt Lewis' performance in the film was vastly underrated and deserved more acclaim.
According to an interview with Lewis in the February 7, 1983, edition of People magazine, he claimed that Scorsese and De Niro employed method acting tricks, including making a slew of anti-Semitic epithets during the filming to "pump up Lewis's anger". Lewis described making the film as a pleasurable experience and noted that he got along well with both Scorsese and De Niro. Lewis said he was invited to collaborate on certain aspects of the script dealing with celebrity life. He suggested an ending in which Rupert Pupkin kills Jerry, but was turned down. As a result, Lewis thought that the film, while good, did not have a "finish".

In an interview for the DVD, Scorsese stated that Jerry Lewis suggested that the brief scene where Jerry Langford is accosted by an old lady for autographs, who screams, "You should only get cancer", when Lewis politely rebuffs her, was based on a real-life incident that happened to Lewis. Scorsese said Lewis directed the actress playing the old lady to get the timing right.

Writing 
At the time he wrote his script, Paul D. Zimmerman was inspired by a David Susskind show on autograph hunters and an Esquire article on a fanatical Johnny Carson follower. Scorsese first became aware of Zimmerman's script after it was brought to him by Robert De Niro in 1974, but declined the project citing that he felt no personal connection with it. Michael Cimino was attached to direct but his involvement with the script fell through when he left the project to direct Heaven's Gate. Prompted by the alienation he felt from his growing celebrity status, and De Niro's insistence that the film could be made "real fast", and that it would be a "New York movie" Scorsese's interest in the project was rekindled.

Casting 
Scorsese's first choice for talk show host Jerry Langford was Johnny Carson. Carson refused the role, saying "you know that one take is enough for me". The entire Rat Pack was also considered—specifically Frank Sinatra and Dean Martin—before a decision was made to select Martin's old partner, Jerry Lewis.

Principal photography 
Arnon Milchan suggested shooting begin a month earlier than scheduled to avoid possible work stoppage from the DGA strike. Furthermore, Scorsese was not in good health. The film was shot over a twenty-week period, with Scorsese shooting from 4 pm to 7 pm every day.

Scorsese's health 
Scorsese had suffered from poor health both before and during the film's production. He had previously worked on three films close together and not long after, found himself hospitalized due to exhaustion and pneumonia. He had not recovered when shooting began. The intensive filming schedule meant Scorsese could spend the remainder of his time recuperating.

Music 
Robbie Robertson produced the music for the film's soundtrack and contributed his first original work after leaving The Band entitled "Between Trains". This song, a tribute to a member of the production staff who had suddenly died, is on the soundtrack album but not in the movie itself.
The King of Comedy soundtrack is a mix of popular music and thematic orchestral scoring by composer Bob James. The soundtrack includes songs from artists such as B.B. King, Van Morrison and Ray Charles. This kind of hybridization of pop and scored music would later be used in Gangs of New York, The Aviator and The Departed.

Soundtrack album 
A soundtrack album was released on vinyl and cassette by Warner Bros. Records in 1983. The soundtrack was finally released on compact disc by Wounded Bird Records in 2016.

 The Pretenders – "Back on the Chain Gang" (3:51)
 B.B. King – "Ain't Nobody's Business" (3:33)
 Talking Heads – "Swamp" (5:13)
 Bob James – "King of Comedy" (4:23)
 Rickie Lee Jones – "Rainbow Sleeves" (3:39)
 Robbie Robertson – "Between Trains" (3:25)
 Ric Ocasek – "Steal the Night" (3:42)
 Ray Charles – "Come Rain or Come Shine" (3:40)
 David Sanborn – "The Finer Things" (4:27)
 Van Morrison – "Wonderful Remark" (3:57)

Home media 
The King of Comedy was released on Region 1 DVD on December 12, 2002, and on Region 2 on April 19, 2004.

A digital restoration of the movie was presented on April 27, 2013, as the closing film of De Niro's Tribeca Film Festival. This latest version was produced from the film's original camera negatives and features a restored soundtrack. While the restored film was scheduled to be released onto Blu-ray on October 29, 2013, the 30th Anniversary home media release was ultimately delayed for a release date of March 25, 2014.

Stage musical 
In 2015, it was announced a stage musical for Broadway was to be made with Stephen Trask writing the music and lyrics, and a book by Chris D'Arienzo.

Reception 
Although the film was well received by critics, it bombed at the box office. De Niro said that the film "maybe wasn't so well received because it gave off an aura of something that people didn't want to look at or know". , 90% of critics have given the film a positive review on review aggregator Rotten Tomatoes based on 67 critic reviews, with an average rating of 8.30/10. The site's critics consensus states, "Largely misunderstood upon its release, The King of Comedy today looks eerily prescient, and features a fine performance by Robert De Niro as a strangely sympathetic psychopath." Metacritic gives it a weighted average score of 73 out of 100 based on 13 critic reviews, indicating "generally favorable reviews".

Time Out called it "Creepiest movie of the year in every sense, and one of the best". Roger Ebert of the Chicago Sun-Times gave the film three out of four stars, writing, "The King of Comedy is one of the most arid, painful, wounded movies I've ever seen. It's hard to believe Scorsese made it". He also wrote, "Scorsese doesn't want laughs in this movie, and he also doesn't want release. The whole movie is about the inability of the characters to get any kind of a positive response to their bids for recognition." He concluded the film "is not, you may already have guessed, a fun movie. It is also not a bad movie. It is frustrating to watch, unpleasant to remember, and, in its own way, quite effective."

Dave Kehr of the Chicago Reader gave the film a favorable review, calling it "clearly an extension of Taxi Driver and the "uncenteredness of the film is irritating, though it's irritating in an ambitious, risk-taking way". Joyce Millman of Salon called it "Martin Scorsese's second-least popular movie, after The Last Temptation of Christ. Which is a shame, because it's Scorsese's second-greatest film, after Taxi Driver". However, not all critics gave the film positive reviews. Adam Smith of Empire Magazine called it "Neither funny enough to be an effective black comedy nor scary enough to capitalise on its thriller/horror elements".

David Ehrenstein, author of The Scorsese Picture, noted the mixed response of the film in his 1983 review. He stated that The King of Comedy "cuts too close to the bone for either large-scale mass audience approval or unanimous mainstream critical acclaim". He believed that the film presented a very critical portrayal of the Reagan administration in contrast to other films made during the administration's early years (although the script was written well before Reagan's election, and shooting began less than five months after Reagan took office). "At a time when the film world piles on simple-minded sentiment in thick gooey gobs, a picture like The King of Comedy appears a frontal assault. The triumph of the 'little guy' is revealed to be nothing more than lumpen neo-Fascist blood lust."

Pauline Kael of The New Yorker was one of the critics who disliked the film, describing the character of Rupert Pupkin as "Jake LaMotta without fists". She went on to write that "De Niro in disguise denies his characters a soul. De Niro's 'bravura' acting in Mean Streets, Taxi Driver and New York, New York collapsed into 'anti-acting' after he started turning himself into repugnant flesh effigies of soulless characters ... Pupkin is a nothing." Scorsese says that "people were confused with King of Comedy and saw Bob as some sort of mannequin". Scorsese has called De Niro's role as Rupert Pupkin his favorite of all their collaborations.

Legacy 
Sandra Bernhard, who plays Masha in the film, indicated in a 2013 interview that Jack Black was interested in a remake. However, she dismissed the idea, saying it was "too late" to do it. Actor Steve Carell and director Bennett Miller, both black comedy fans, cited The King of Comedy as a personal favorite and inspiration to shape the sociopath character of John E. du Pont in Foxcatcher.

The Japanese filmmaker Akira Kurosawa cited The King of Comedy as one of his favorite films.

The film's reputation has grown over time, with some ranking it among Scorsese's finest films. The screenplay for the 2019 film Joker, written by director Todd Phillips and co-writer Scott Silver, is frequently cited by Phillips as drawing inspiration from both The King of Comedy and Scorsese's 1976 film Taxi Driver.

Debate about ending 
Film scholar David Bordwell, writing in Film Viewer's Guide, mentioned the (un)reality of the ending as a topic for debate, as there is no definitive answer as to whether the ending is reality or fantasy. By the end of the film the line between fantasy and reality is blurred for the audience as well as the character. Scorsese does not offer a clear answer but forces each viewer to make up his or her own mind as to how to interpret the film.

In his commentary on The Criterion Collection DVD of Black Narcissus, Scorsese stated that Michael Powell's films influenced The King of Comedy in its conception of fantasy. Scorsese said that Powell always treated fantasy as no different than reality, and so made fantasy sequences as realistic as possible. Scorsese suggests that Rupert Pupkin's character fails to differentiate between his fantasies and reality in much the same way. Scorsese sought to achieve the same with the film so that, in his words, the "fantasy is more real than reality".

Taxi Driver connection 
Rupert Pupkin has been compared to Travis Bickle in Taxi Driver: both characters have serious issues with reality testing that is drawing the line between outer objective and inner subjective reality. In her review, entertainment columnist Marilyn Beck approved Johnny Carson's refusal to participate in The King of Comedy, supposedly because he feared the film could inspire psychopaths like John Hinckley. Beck considered The King of Comedy even more dangerous than Taxi Driver due to its lack of blood and gore, as well as the fact that viewers could easily identify with De Niro. In a documentary featured in the first DVD release of the film, Scorsese himself acknowledged the connection between the two characters: "Taxi Driver. Travis. Rupert. The isolated person. Is Rupert more violent than Travis? Maybe."

Critic's lists 
 American Film's list of the Best Films of the 1980s – #10
 Halliwell's Top 1000 – #180
 1001 Movies You Must See Before You Die
 Jonathan Rosenbaum: 1000 Essential Films
 The New York Times Guide to the Best 1,000 Movies Ever Made
 Empires The 500 Greatest Movies of All Time – #87

References

Works cited

Further reading

External links

 
 
 
 Jon Dambacher, "The Imitation of A Dream", 2010

1982 films
1982 comedy films
1980s American films
1980s English-language films
1980s black comedy films
1980s crime comedy films
1980s satirical films
20th Century Fox films
American black comedy films
American crime comedy films
American satirical films
Films about comedians
Films about kidnapping in the United States
Films about narcissism
Films about stalking
Films about television
Films about the Federal Bureau of Investigation
Films directed by Martin Scorsese
Films produced by Arnon Milchan
Films scored by Robbie Robertson
Films set in New York City
Films shot in New Jersey
Films shot in New York City
Films whose writer won the Best Original Screenplay BAFTA Award
Regency Enterprises films